Royaye Ma (A Dream), is a single by Iranian singers, Ebi and Shadmehr, released in 2012. In this single singers critic the governing idea of this world which is based on war and cruelness.

Music video
The singers released the music video sponsored by Roshen confectionery. The video focuses on the children who are main victims of wars.

Global tour
Ebi and Shadmehr performed the song in different cities such as:
 Vancouver, 
 London, HMV Forum

References 

2012 singles
Persian-language songs
2012 songs